Islamic Philosophy from its Origin to the Present: Philosophy in the Land of Prophecy is a book by Seyyed Hossein Nasr, Iranian philosopher and University Professor of Islamic studies at George Washington University, including a comprehensive overview of Islamic philosophy from the 9th century to the present day.

Overview 
The book "Islamic Philosophy from its Origin to the Present: Philosophy in the Land of Prophecy" is a narrative of the development and ups and downs of philosophy in the Islamic world and its relationship with revelation and holy matter. The author, Seyyed Hossein Nasr, mentions in the book that the purpose of compiling and writing this work is to present Islamic philosophy in the form of teachings and the history of philosophy that has lived and developed in the Islamic world under the influence of revelation.

The author explains in the book that he is mostly focused on the later period of Islamic philosophy, especially in Iran; Because after the Mongol invasion, Iran became the most important arena for the continuation of the life of Islamic philosophy. In such a situation, the philosophy became more and more close to the inner truths revealed through revelation. The author believes that the emphasis on late Islamic philosophy is also interesting from the point of view of comparative studies, because it shows how two philosophical traditions – one Islamic and the other Christian – separated their ways and followed such different destinies.

The book "Islamic Philosophy from its Origin to the Present: Philosophy in the Land of Prophecy" is mentioned as the result of about fifty years of study and reflection of the author about philosophy and philosophical issues. In the introduction of the Persian translation of the book, it is stated that Seyyed Hossein Nasr along with Henry Corbin are among the researchers who have been trying to break the monologue of Western-minded orientalists about the history of Islamic thought, and this work is also an attempt by Seyyed Hossein Nasr to challenge the narratives of orientalists about Islamic thought.

Chapters 
The book begins with the preface and transliteration sections, as well as the author's introduction, and in the first part, the author presents a report on contemporary Western research on Islamic philosophy. Explanation of the position of Islamic philosophy in the Islamic world and its relations with other affairs and sciences, as well as the meaning of Islamic philosophy from the perspective of Muslim philosophers, is of interest in this section. In the first part of the book under the title of "ISLAMIC PHILOSOPHY AND ITS STUDY", it deals with three topics:

Also, in the second part, under the title of "PHILOSOPHICAL ISSUES", the author has discussed the existence of the underlying content and skeletonization of Islamic philosophy; The beating heart of metaphysics in Islamic philosophy is the being. A theme that was also reflected in Martin Heidegger's opinion declares the way to salvation is to return to the being. Western philosophy talks about the end of metaphysics, but the current of Islamic philosophy is the convergence between ontology and metaphysics, so that it has been proposed in Mulla Sadra's philosophy, based on the theory of the "Primacy of Existence" The second part deals with the following topics:

The third part, titled "ISLAMIC PHILOSOPHY IN HISTORY", is the most detailed part of the book. At first, the author presents his proposed framework for the study, dealing with Islamic philosophy from the beginning to the contemporary period. The third part of the book deals with the following topics:

In the fourth part of the book, the author deals with the current state of thought in the lands of Islam and lists the relations between Islam and modern thought and examines the flow of philosophy in the realm of prophecy in the past and present under the title of "THE CURRENT SITUATION". The fourth part of the book includes the following topics:

The book ends with "Notes" and "Index" sections.

Release 
The book "Islamic Philosophy from its Origin to the Present: Philosophy in the Land of Prophecy" was published originally in English in the United States by State University of New York Press (SUNY Press) in 2006. The book was translated into Persian and published in 2015 and 2017 by various publications in Iran.

See also 
 Platonism in Islamic philosophy
 Sophie's World
 The Pragmatic Entente: Israeli–Iranian Relations, 1948–1988
 Not for the Faint of Heart: Lessons in Courage, Power and Persistence
 Foucault in Iran: Islamic Revolution after the Enlightenment
 Iran Between Two Revolutions

References

External links 
 Islamic Philosophy from Its Origin to the Present: Philosophy in the Land of Prophecy, by Seyyed Hossein Nasr – Iqbal
 Islamic Philosophy from its Origin to the Present Philosophy in the Land of Prophecy by Seyyed Hossein Nasr – Goodreads
 Islamic Philosophy from Its Origin to the Present Philosophy in the Land of ... – Seyyed Hossein Nasr – Google Books
 Islamic Philosophy from its Origin to the Present Philosophy in the Land of Prophecy by Seyyed Hossein Nasr – PDF

2006 books
English-language books
Contemporary Islamic philosophy
History of philosophy
Works about the history of philosophy
Seyyed Hossein Nasr
Books about Islam